K. Thangamani is an Indian politician and former Member of the Legislative Assembly of Tamil Nadu. He was elected to the Tamil Nadu legislative assembly as a Communist Party of India candidate from Manamadurai constituency in 1996 election. The constituency was reserved for candidates from the Scheduled Castes.

References 

Communist Party of India politicians from Tamil Nadu
Living people
Year of birth missing (living people)
Tamil Nadu MLAs 1996–2001